The Peace Party (BP) was an Alevi Turkish political party founded in 1996 in Turkey by former Republican People's Party (CHP) MP Ali Haydar Veziroğlu and existed until its closure in 1999 after the Turkish general election of 1999.

It had its roots among the Alevi-Shi'i population in Turkey. It failed to gain any seats in the Turkish Parliament under the party leadership of Ali Haydar Veziroğlu. Its predecessor was the Unity Party (Türkiye Birlik Partisi, TBP) between 1966 and 1981.

History of the Alevis
Political parties established in 1996
1996 establishments in Turkey
Defunct political parties in Turkey
Political parties disestablished in 1999
1999 disestablishments in Turkey